Tres Pozos  is a village and municipality in Chaco Province in northern Argentina.  Tres Pozos is the place chosen to project a fourth bridge between the provinces of Chaco and Formosa .

References

Populated places in Chaco Province